Clodius may refer to:

 several ancient Romans, particularly the tribune Publius Clodius Pulcher; see Clodius
 Frederick Clod, last name also given as Clodius, 17th-century alchemist
 Karl Clodius, a German diplomat during World War II; known for negotiating the "Clodius agreement" with Turkey
 Robert Clodius, an American educator
 Parnassius clodius, a butterfly

See also
 Clodia, sister of Clodius Pulcher
Leges Clodiae, legislation sponsored by Clodius Pulcher as tribune in the 1st century BC